Skiritida (before 2001: Σκυρίτιδα - Skyritida) is a former municipality in Arcadia, Peloponnese, Greece. It was formed at the 1997 Kapodistrias reform; the seat of the municipality was in Vlachokerasia. Since the 2011 local government reform it is part of the municipality Tripoli, of which it is a municipal unit. The municipal unit has an area of 186.164 km2. It had a population of 1,265 at the 2011 census.

Subdivisions
The municipal unit Skiritida is subdivided into the following communities (constituent villages in brackets):
Agia Varvara
Alepochori
Kerasia
Kollines (Kollines, Achouri, Voutouchos)
Pigadakia
Vlachokerasia
Vourvoura

References

Populated places in Arcadia, Peloponnese